Charles Creswell (10 March 1813 – 22 November 1882) was an English cricketer who played first-class cricket from 1836 to 1843.  Mainly associated with Nottinghamshire, he made 12 known appearances in first-class matches.  He represented the North in the North v. South series.

References

1813 births
1882 deaths
English cricketers
English cricketers of 1826 to 1863
Nottinghamshire cricketers
North v South cricketers
Cricketers from Nottingham